Dhanus may refer to:

 Dhanus (month), a month in the Hindu calendar
 Dhanus, a month in the Darian calendar
 Dhanus (arachnid), a genus of pseudoscorpions
 Dhanus (weapon), an Indian bow as used in Indian warfare 
 Dhanus, an ancient Indian measure of length equal to four hastas

See also 
 Dhanush (disambiguation)
 Dhanu (disambiguation)